Sunnyside Farm is the title of a 1997 BBC comedy television series. The basic plot was that brothers Ray and Ken Sunnyside inherited the failing Sunnyside Farm. Ray, played by Phil Daniels, is a truly repulsive individual, and intends to get his brother committed to a mental institution so he can sell the farm and blow the proceeds on the high life; Ken (Mark Addy), while not the sharpest pencil in the box at least has a few redeeming characteristics. Other notable actors to appear in the series were Matt Lucas and Michael Kitchen. The show's theme music was written and performed by Damon Albarn and Phil Daniels although it was credited to Albarn's band Blur.

Reception
Receiving mixed critical notices, it was not renewed after the first series of 6 episodes.

References

External links
 
 

BBC television sitcoms
1997 British television series debuts
1997 British television series endings
1990s British comedy television series
British television miniseries
English-language television shows